Eden Township is one of the thirteen townships of Wyandot County, Ohio, United States.  The 2010 census found 1,092 people in the township.

Geography
Located in the eastern part of the county, it borders the following townships:
Sycamore Township - north
Texas Township, Crawford County - northeast corner
Tod Township, Crawford County - east
Antrim Township - south
Crane Township - west
Tymochtee Township - northwest

Part of the village of Nevada is located in southeastern Eden Township.

Name and history
Statewide, other Eden Townships are located in Licking and Seneca counties.

Government
The township is governed by a three-member board of trustees, who are elected in November of odd-numbered years to a four-year term beginning on the following January 1. Two are elected in the year after the presidential election and one is elected in the year before it. There is also an elected township fiscal officer, who serves a four-year term beginning on April 1 of the year after the election, which is held in November of the year before the presidential election. Vacancies in the fiscal officership or on the board of trustees are filled by the remaining trustees.

References

External links
County website

Townships in Wyandot County, Ohio
Townships in Ohio